This is the complete list of Pan American Games medalists in tennis from 1951 to 2019. Tennis was not held in the 1971 edition, but has otherwise been played at every games.

Current events

Men's singles

Women's singles

Men's doubles

Women's doubles

Mixed doubles

Discontinued events

Men's team

Women's team

References

Tennis